Sara Errani and Roberta Vinci were the defending champions. They reached the final this year, but lost to unseeded pair Peng Shuai and Hsieh Su-wei 4–6, 6–3, [10–8].

Seeds
The top four seeds receive a bye into the second round.

Draw

Finals

Top half

Bottom half

References
 Main Draw

Italian Open - Doubles
Women's Doubles